Chemora District is a district of Batna Province, Algeria.

Municipalities
The district is further divided into two municipalities.
Chemora
Boulhilat

Districts of Batna Province